The William Ducker House is a historic house in Red Cloud, Nebraska. It was built in 1886 by Robert Cochrane, an immigrant from England who was author Willa Cather's Latin teacher. The house was designed in the Greek Revival architectural style. The house has been listed on the National Register of Historic Places since February 11, 1982.

References

External links

		
National Register of Historic Places in Webster County, Nebraska
Greek Revival architecture in Nebraska
Houses completed in 1886